Peeter Michelson (1891 Kirepi Parish (now Elva Parish), Kreis Dorpat – ?) was an Estonian politician. He was a member of II Riigikogu. He was a member of the Riigikogu since 22 March 1924. He replaced Mihkel Laar. On 9 April 1924 he was removed from his position and he was replaced by Hugo Kaas.

References

1891 births
Year of death missing
People from Elva Parish
People from Kreis Dorpat
Workers' United Front politicians
Members of the Riigikogu, 1923–1926